William E. Clark (July 31, 1925 – July 30, 1986) was an American jazz drummer.

Career 
Clark worked professionally starting shortly after World War II, playing with Jimmy Jones, Dave Martin, Mundell Lowe, and George Duvivier. He was principally active in the 1950s, working with Lester Young, Mary Lou Williams, Lena Horne, Hazel Scott, Duke Ellington, Don Byas, Arnold Ross, Bernard Peiffer, George Shearing, Toots Thielemans, Ronnell Bright, Jackie Paris, and Rolf Kuhn. Later in his career he worked with Eddie Harris and Les McCann.

References
Rick Mattingly, "Bill Clark". The New Grove Dictionary of Jazz. 2nd edition, ed. Barry Kernfeld, 2004.

American jazz drummers
People from Jonesboro, Arkansas
1925 births
1986 deaths
20th-century American drummers
American male drummers
Jazz musicians from Arkansas
20th-century American male musicians
American male jazz musicians